Dendrophilia albidella is a moth of the family Gelechiidae. It was described by Snellen in 1884. It is found in Russia (central and southern Siberia and Primorskii krai).

References

albidella
Moths described in 1884
Moths of Japan
Taxa named by Samuel Constantinus Snellen van Vollenhoven